The 2020–21 season is Rotherham United's 96th season in their existence and the first back in the Championship following promotion last season. The club also participated in the FA Cup and the EFL Cup.

Key events
The delayed season started for Rotherham on 5 September 2021, with a defeat on penalties in the EFL cup to League 2 side Salford City.

On 15 September, manager Paul Warne and his assistant Richie Barker signed new contracts, keeping them at the club until the summer of 2023.

Rotherham suffered long-term injuries to four key players in the five weeks between 7 October and 12 November. Chiedozie Ogbene required knee surgery, and was ruled out until at least January; Clark Robertson suffered a broken foot, which ruled him out until the end of the winter; Shaun MacDonald broke his leg in the game against Stoke City on 31 October, and was out until the new year; and Kieran Sadlier suffered an ankle injury in the game against Preston the following Saturday, keeping him side-lined for three months.

In the run-up to Christmas, the club were hit by an outbreak of COVID-19, causing the postponements of the planned games against Derby County and Middlesbrough. They returned to competition on 29 December against Barnsley, under perceived threat of a points deduction if they did not complete the fixture, despite having an "obliterated" squad, and only being able to name six substitutes.

The first scheduled game of 2021, at home against Cardiff City, was called off an hour before kick-off due to snow, adding to the fixture congestion the club would face later in the season. A week later, Rotherham exited the FA Cup at the first attempt, after a close game with Everton went to extra time, due to FA Cup ties needing to be resolved in a single match this season.

A waterlogged pitch on 2 February caused the game against Derby County, postponed from December, to be postponed again. This time it was able to take place the following day. Nine days later, a frozen pitch led to the postponement of the fixture against QPR.

On 3 March 2021, the club beat Sheffield Wednesday 2–1 at Hillsborough Stadium, despite having Michael Smith sent off (a decision which was later overturned), claiming a first-ever league double over their South Yorkshire rivals.

On 5 March 2021, Rotherham announced a second COVID-19 outbreak at the club, causing the postponement of games against Brentford and Luton Town, the latter of which had already been moved once due to Luton's appearance in the FA Cup fourth round. On 9 March, further positive COVID-19 tests were announced, and the game against Coventry City was postponed. At this stage, with the Luton and Coventry games yet to be rescheduled, the club had only one free midweek slot left in the calendar.

By 8 April 2021, the club faced a run-in which entailed playing ten games in 28 days, including four in nine days between 10 April and 18 April.

A 1–0 defeat to Brentford in the rearranged game on 27 April 2021 saw Rotherham set an EFL record of 19 single-goal defeats in a season.

Going into the final game of the season, Rotherham sat two points from safety, needing to win and hope Derby County did not. They led at Cardiff City from the eighth minute of the game, but conceded an equaliser two minutes from the end of normal time.

Squad statistics

Player statistics
 
Players with zero appearances have been unused substitutes in one or more games.

Goalscorers

Pre-season friendlies
Due to the COVID-19 situation meaning fans could not attend games at the time, a full pre-season schedule was not published by the club. The club were involved in a friendly game on 18 August 2020 against Gainsborough Trinity, which ended with a 6–0 victory. The club also played unadvertised games against Hull City and Doncaster Rovers.

Competitions

Championship

League table

Results summary

Results by matchday

Matches
The 2020–21 season fixtures were released on 21 August.

FA Cup

The third round draw was made on 30 November, with Premier League and EFL Championship clubs all entering the competition.

EFL Cup

The first round draw was made on 18 August, live on Sky Sports, by Paul Merson.

Transfers

Transfers in

Loans in

Loans out

Transfers out

References

Rotherham United
Rotherham United F.C. seasons